Ethumai Methumai is a 2011 Sri Lankan Sinhala comedy film directed by Nishantha Weerasingha and produced by Upul Jayasinghe for Nilwala Films. It stars Rodney Warnakula, Priyantha Seneviratne and Anarkali Akarsha in lead roles along with Duleeka Marapana and Anton Jude. Music composed by George Senanayake. It is the 1165th Sri Lankan film in the Sinhala cinema.

Plot

Cast
 Rodney Warnakula as Bothal Sira
 Priyantha Seneviratne as Kusumsiri
 Anarkali Akarsha as Teena
 Duleeka Marapana as Kusumsiri's wife
 Ananda Wickramage as Silva
 Anton Jude as Andapala, Sira's thug friend 
 Mahinda Pathirage as Tyson
 Susila Kottage as Fishing lady
 Ronnie Leitch as Chinese doctor
 Hemantha Iriyagama as Hospital security officer
 Shehara Hewaduwa as Thanuja, Kusumsiri's mistress
 Ruwan Wasantha
 Chalani Balasuriya
 Ruwangi Rathnayake as Nurse
 D.B. Gangodathenna as Ladder house man
 Nishantha Muthuhettigamage in cameo role

Soundtrack

References

2011 films
2010s Sinhala-language films
2011 comedy films
Sri Lankan comedy films